"Chapter 18: The Mines of Mandalore" is the second episode of the third season of the American streaming television series The Mandalorian. It was written by showrunner Jon Favreau and directed by Rachel Morrison. It was released on Disney+ on March 8, 2023. The episode received positive reviews from critics.

Plot 
The Mandalorian and Grogu head to Tatooine and reunites with Peli Motto, whom he hopes will have a memory core that he can use to revive IG-11. She does not have one, but offers to sell him R5-D4 instead. The Mandalorian reluctantly agrees. The Mandalorian and Grogu head to Mandalore. The Mandalorian sends R5-D4 to scan the planet. When he does not answer, he heads into a cave to find him. There he is attacked by several Alamites, who he kills with the Darksaber. After running several tests, The Mandalorian discovers that the planet's air is breathable, and heads back out with Grogu. They head below the city of Sundari, in search of the mines. There he finds an old Mandalorian helmet, which is a trap set up by a cyborg creature. The creature captures The Mandalorian and imprisons him.

The Mandalorian sends Grogu to find Bo-Katan Kryze and ask her to save him. Bo-Katan is unimpressed to see The Mandalorian's ship outside her castle, but agrees to help Grogu save The Mandalorian. After killing the creature using the Darksaber, she saves him, and offers to keep him safe before heading back to Kalevala. The Mandalorian refuses, insisting he bathes in the living waters. The Mandalorian bathes himself in the waters, while reciting the creed's words. He sinks to the bottom, however, and Bo-Katan dives in to save him. She manages to rescue him and bring him above the surface alive, and sees the Mythosaur on her way up, realizing the stories she was told as a child were true.

Production

Development 
The episode was directed by Rachel Morrison, from a screenplay by series creator Jon Favreau.

Casting
The co-starring cast for this episode returned from previous episodes, including Amy Sedaris as Peli Motto. The Mandalorian is physically portrayed by stunt doubles Brendan Wayne and Lateef Crowder, with Wayne and Crowder receiving co-star credit for the second time in the episode. Pedro Pascal and Katee Sackhoff star as the Mandalorian and Bo-Katan Kryze, respectively.

Music 
Joseph Shirley composed the musical score for the episode, replacing Ludwig Göransson.

Reception 
On Rotten Tomatoes, the episode has a score of 91% based on reviews from 22 critics, with an average rating of 8/10. The website's critics consensus reads: "Brisk and straightforward, "The Mines of Mandalore" efficiently dives into The Mandalorian latest story arc with a poorly-lit adventure, getting a big lift from Katee Sackhoff's charisma."

References

External links 
 
 

2023 American television episodes
The Mandalorian episodes